Darren Newton (born 16 May 1969 in Ashington, Northumberland, England) is an English actor, writer and director.

Trained at Royal Scottish Academy of Music and Drama, Glasgow, he appeared as Gavin Hindle in Eldorado and subsequently in several Catherine Cookson films, before moving into theatre directing. He has an MA in Scriptwriting from Sussex University.

Newton writes and directs using the name D. James Newton; his debut feature film 2:Hrs, by Roland Moore, was released in 2017.

Filmography
The Glass Virgin (1995) - Willy Fairburn
The Cinder Path (1994)
Eldorado (1992) - Gavin Hindle
Women In Tropical Places (1989)
Stormy Monday (1988)

Director
 2:Hrs (2018)

External links

English male film actors
English male television actors
People from Ashington
Male actors from Northumberland
1969 births
Living people
Alumni of the University of Sussex
Alumni of the Royal Conservatoire of Scotland